Silvan Zurbriggen (born 15 August 1981) is a retired Swiss World Cup alpine ski racer who competed primarily in downhill and combined, and occasionally in super-G. In 2012, he stopped competing in slalom due to poor results.

Born in Brig, Valais, Zurbriggen represented Switzerland in seven world championships and two Olympics. He won the silver medal in the slalom before a home crowd at the world championships in 2003 at St. Moritz, and was the Olympic bronze medalist in the combined in 2010 in Vancouver, British Columbia, Canada, held at Whistler. Following his silver medal at age 21, he was the Swiss Winter Sportsman of the year in 2002 / 2003.

Zurbriggen retired from World Cup competition in April 2015 at age 33 with two victories and thirteen podiums. He is a distant cousin of former Swiss ski racers Pirmin Zurbriggen and Heidi Zurbriggen, and the cousin of Elia Zurbriggen.

Following his racing career, he embarked on a career in banking with an 18-month internship at Raiffeisen.

World Cup results

Season standings

Race podiums
 2 wins – (1 Downhill, 1 Combined)
 13 podiums – (2 Downhill, 3 Slalom, 8 Combined)

World Championship results

Olympic results

References

External links
 
 Silvan Zurbriggen World Cup standings at the International Ski Federation
 
 
  

Swiss male alpine skiers
Alpine skiers at the 2006 Winter Olympics
Alpine skiers at the 2010 Winter Olympics
1981 births
Living people
Olympic alpine skiers of Switzerland
Olympic bronze medalists for Switzerland
Olympic medalists in alpine skiing
Medalists at the 2010 Winter Olympics
Alpine skiers at the 2014 Winter Olympics
People from Brig-Glis
Sportspeople from Valais